The Last Pardon (French: Le dernier pardon) is a 1913 French silent comedy film directed by Maurice Tourneur.

Cast
 Maurice de Féraudy
 Charles Krauss 
 Fernande Petit
 Polaire 
 Henry Roussel 
 Mme. Van Doren

References

Bibliography
 Waldman, Harry. Maurice Tourneur: The Life and Films. McFarland, 2001.

External links

1913 films
Films directed by Maurice Tourneur
French silent films
1913 comedy films
French comedy films
French black-and-white films
1910s French films